Kovačica (Cyrillic: Ковачица) may refer to:

Kovačica (town), a town in the municipality of Kovačica, Serbia
Kovačica (Kosovska Mitrovica), a village in the municipality of Kosovska Mitrovica
Kovačica (Lopare), a village in the municipality of Lopare, Bosnia and Herzegovina
Kovačica (Tuzla), a village in the municipality of Tuzla, Bosnia and Herzegovina
 Donja Kovačica, a village in the municipality of Veliki Grđevac, Croatia
 Gornja Kovačica, a village in the municipality of Veliki Grđevac, Croatia

See also
Kovachitsa (Ковачица), a village in the municipality of Lom, Bulgaria
Kovač (disambiguation)
Kovači (disambiguation)
Kovačić (disambiguation)
Kovačići (disambiguation)
Kovačice, a village
Kovačina, a village
Kovačevo (disambiguation)
Kovačevac (disambiguation)
Kovačevci (disambiguation)
Kovačevići (disambiguation)
Kováčová (disambiguation)
Kováčovce, a village